Chiloglanis somereni, Someren's suckermouth, is a species of upside-down catfish native to Kenya and Tanzania where it is found in rivers around Lake Victoria.  This species grows to a length of  SL.

References 

 

somereni
Freshwater fish of Kenya
Freshwater fish of Tanzania
Fish described in 1958